Killea is a village in Donegal, Ireland, located on the border with County Londonderry in Northern Ireland.

History

In recent years, many new homes have been built in the area and the village now acts largely as a commuter village for Derry.

Killea was one of several Protestant villages in eastern Donegal that would have been transferred to Northern Ireland, had the recommendations of the Irish Boundary Commission been enacted in 1925.

Notable residents
Kevin McHugh - a footballer who played in the League of Ireland with Finn Harps and Derry City

See also
 List of populated places in Ireland

References

Towns and villages in County Donegal